Gerald Joseph Korab (born September 15, 1948) is a Canadian former professional hockey player, who was a defenceman in the National Hockey League from 1971 to 1985. Korab was born in Sault Ste. Marie, Ontario.

Nicknamed "King Kong", Korab made a solid reputation for himself in the 1970s-era NHL as a physical defenceman. His size gave him a distinct advantage in his own zone, and he possessed a hard shot and some offensive skills.

Making his NHL debut with the Chicago Black Hawks in 1970-71, Korab was asked to keep the front of his own net clear. He continued to play the same role for the next two seasons while scoring 12 goals in 1972-73 and helping Chicago reach the Stanley Cup finals in 1971 and 1973.

Korab's best years were spent on the blueline of the Buffalo Sabres from 1973 to 1980, where he blossomed into an effective defenceman on one of the best young teams in the league. Korab was a physical presence while hitting double-digits in goals four times, helping the Sabres reach their first Stanley Cup final in 1975. He was selected to play in the 1975 and 1976 NHL All-Star Games. During this period he also established himself as the NHL's "best dressed player" for three years running, beginning with his time with the Vancouver Canucks during the 1973-74 season, when he became a fan of designer and master tailor Paul Minichiello.

Korab was traded to the Los Angeles Kings on March 10, 1980, for a first-round draft choice that Buffalo used to select offensive defenceman Phil Housley. In 1983, he retired but two months into the season he was offered a chance to make a comeback with the Sabres. He would retire for good after playing 25 games with the Sabres in 1984-85.

Korab currently owns and operates Korab Inc., a packaging service located in Bellwood, Illinois.

Career statistics

References

External links

1948 births
Living people
Buffalo Sabres players
Canadian ice hockey defencemen
Chicago Blackhawks players
Ice hockey people from Ontario
Los Angeles Kings players
Port Huron Flags (IHL) players
Portland Buckaroos players
Rochester Americans players
St. Catharines Black Hawks players
Sportspeople from Sault Ste. Marie, Ontario
Vancouver Canucks players